was a Japanese Zen Buddhist monk, a poet and diplomat in the Muromachi period.  He was the chief envoy of a 1547 mission sent by the Ashikaga shogunate to the court of the Jiajing Emperor in  Beijing.

Tenryū-ji abbot
Sakugen was a member of the community of monks at Tenryū-ji before his travels in China from 1538 to 1541 and from 1546 to 1550.

He was the vice envoy of the mission which traveled to China in 1541. The trade negotiations proceeded smoothly, and in the leisurely months of his stay, Sakugen spent his time sightseeing, visiting Chinese poets and studying Chinese styles of composition.  He would later write several books about his experiences in China.

In China, Sakugen bought or received as gifts 17 books which were later copied and distributed in Japan.

He would be named abbot of the Tenryū-ji monastery.

Missions to China
The economic benefit of the Sinocentric tribute system was profitable trade. The tally trade (kangō bōeki or kanhe maoyi in Chinese) involved exchanges of Japanese products for Chinese goods.  The Chinese "tally" was a certificate issued by the Ming.  The first 100 such tallies were conveyed to Japan in 1404.  Only those with this formal proof of Imperial permission represented by the document were officially allowed to travel and trade within the boundaries of China; and only those diplomatic missions presenting authentic tallies were received as legitimate ambassadors.

See also
 Japanese missions to Ming China

Notes

References
 Fogel, Joshua A. (2009). Articulating the Sinosphere: Sino-Japanese Relations in Space and Time. Cambridge: Harvard University Press. ; 
 __. (1996). The Literature of Travel in the Japanese Rediscovery of China, 1862-1945. Stanford: Stanford University Press. ; 
 Goodrich, Luther Carrington and Zhaoying Fang. (1976).  Dictionary of Ming biography, 1368-1644 (明代名人傳), Vol. I;  Dictionary of Ming biography, 1368-1644 (明代名人傳), Vol. II.  New York: Columbia University Press. ; ; 
 Kornicki, Peter Francis. (1997). The Book in Japan: a Cultural History from the Beginning to the Nineteenth Century, 7 Volumes. Leiden: Brill Publishers. ; 
 Nussbaum, Louis Frédéric and Käthe Roth. (2005). Japan Encyclopedia. Cambridge: Harvard University Press. ; 
  Titsingh, Isaac, ed. (1834). [Siyun-sai Rin-siyo/Hayashi Gahō, 1652], Nipon o daï itsi ran; ou,  Annales des empereurs du Japon.  Paris: Oriental Translation Fund of Great Britain and Ireland. 
 Yoda, Yoshiie. (1996). The Foundations of Japan's Modernization: a comparison with China's Path towards Modernization. Leiden: Brill Publishers. ; 

Japanese diplomats
1501 births
1579 deaths
Rinzai Buddhists
Buddhist poets